Lloyd Garrison "Chick" Davies (March 6, 1892 – September 5, 1973) was a professional baseball player who played for the Philadelphia Athletics (1914–1915) and the New York Giants (1925–1926) as a pitcher and outfielder. He led the National League in saves (6) and games finished (29) in 1926. Davies was an alumnus of the University of Massachusetts Amherst. He died September 5, 1973, in Middletown, Connecticut.

See also
 List of Major League Baseball annual saves leaders

References

1892 births
1973 deaths
Major League Baseball outfielders
Major League Baseball pitchers
New York Giants (NL) players
Philadelphia Athletics players
New Haven Weissmen players
Newark Bears (IL) players
UMass Minutemen baseball players
Sportspeople from Middletown, Connecticut
People from Peabody, Massachusetts
Baseball players from Massachusetts
Sportspeople from Essex County, Massachusetts